This is a listing of the nationality markings used by military aircraft of the United States, including those of the U.S. Air Force, U.S. Navy, U.S. Marine Corps, U.S. Coast Guard, U.S. Army and their predecessors. The Civil Air Patrol is also included for the World War II period because it engaged in combat operations (primarily anti-submarine flights) which its July 1946 charter has since explicitly forbidden.

History

The first military aviation insignias of the United States include a star used by the US Army Signal Corps Aviation Section, seen during the Pancho Villa punitive expedition, just over a year before American involvement in World War I began. The star was painted only on the vertical tail, in either red (the most often used color) or blue (less likely, due to the strictly orthochromatic photography of that era, rendering the red star as a black one in period photos). At the same time, the US Navy was using a blue anchor on the rudders of its seaplanes.

After American entry into World War I
As of 19 May 1917 all branches of the military, outside of the Western Front of Europe were to use a circular dark-blue field containing the single, five-pointed regular pentagram-outline white star, symbolic of a U.S. state from the national flag, itself containing a central red circle, painted in the official flag colors.

A tricolor roundel was introduced by the US Army Air Service in February 1918 for commonality with the other European Allies, all of whom used similar roundels. American aircraft also used vertically-striped British and French style tricolors on the rudders during World War I, the British and French markings having the blue stripe forward, while American regulations specified that their aircraft have the red stripe forward although some of their aircraft had the colors in the French order. The order of the USAAS roundel's colors were similar to those of the defunct Imperial Russian Air Service. No connection existed between the US roundel and other Allied forces' military aircraft services, beyond the fact that the United States had joined the Allies of World War I and was using a tricolor roundel in what was now an available order. Tsarist aircraft often used a significantly larger white central circle, while the narrower red and blue rings on such large white-centered variant insignia were often separated with additional white rings. From at least as early as the timeframe of the deployment of the First Marine Aviation Force in France during July 1918 until roughly 1922, the USMC's aviation units added an American eagle atop the roundel and a fouled anchor superimposed behind the roundel, mimicking the Eagle, Globe, and Anchor emblem on the fuselage sides in the manner of a unit insignia.

Post-WW I and interwar period
 

In May 1917 the US adopted a red circle-centered white star in a dark blue circular field for all United States military aircraft. In August 1919, following the Armistice that ended World War I, the colors were adjusted to the current standards and the proportions were adjusted slightly so that the centre red circle was reduced slightly from being 1/3 of the diameter of the blue circular field, to being bound by the edges of an imaginary regular pentagon connecting the inner points of the star.

American entry into World War II

The US Army Air Corps began painting its roundel on only the top of the left wing and only the bottom of the right wing February 26, 1941, intended to help facilitate recognition of friend and foe if the United States became embroiled in the spreading conflict.  The other reason was to “eliminate a balanced target” by presenting a somewhat asymmetrical effect — if you see two white stars (i.e., one on each wing), it is easier to aim your guns between them.  The US Navy resisted this change and reverted to the roundel on each wing early in the war January 5, 1942.  However, the US Navy finally adopted the asymmetrical single wing insignia February 1, 1943. 

In the months after Pearl Harbor - following the late-June 1941 conversion of the USAAC into the United States Army Air Forces - it was thought that the central red dot could be mistaken for a Japanese Hinomaru, from a distance and in May 1942 it was eliminated. On aircraft in service they were painted over with white. During November 1942, US forces participated in the Torch landings and for this a chrome yellow ring (of unspecified thickness) was temporarily added to the outside of the roundel to reduce incidents of Americans shooting down unfamiliar British aircraft, which could themselves be distinguished by a similar yellow outline on the RAF's "Type C.1" fuselage roundels of the time. 

None of these solutions was entirely satisfactory as friendly fire incidents continued and so the US Government initiated a study that discovered that the red wasn't the issue since color couldn't be determined from a distance anyway, but the shape could be. After trying out several variations including an oblong roundel with two stars, they arrived at using white bars flanking the sides of the existing roundel, all with a red outline, which became official in June 1943. This still wasn't entirely satisfactory and at least one operational unit refused to add the red, resulting in bare white bars on the existing star roundel. The red outline was then replaced with a blue outline whose color exactly matched the round blue field that held the star in September 1943. On US Navy aircraft painted overall in gloss midnight blue starting in 1944, the blue color of the roundels was similar to midnight blue, so the blue portion was eventually dispensed with and only the white portion of the roundel was painted on the aircraft. In the Pacific Theater, some British Commonwealth aircraft in service with the British Pacific Fleet, and Royal New Zealand Air Force, as with Lend Lease Chance Vought F4U Corsairs, began to officially sport the white "bars" as a more-or-less "universal" symbol on Allied aircraft opposing the Japanese, while also eliminating the red center of the roundels they used for the same reason the United States already had.

Cold War (1945-1991) to present

In January 1947, single bisecting, lengthwise-running red bars, one per side, were added within the existing white bars on both USN and USAAF aircraft – both replacing the old center red circle, and restoring the official presence of a red device in the insignia, much as with the red stripes of the American flag – and in September of the same year, the United States Army Air Forces (USAAF) became an independent service and was renamed the United States Air Force (USAF).

In 1955 the USN would repaint all its aircraft from midnight blue to light grey over white and would use exactly the same roundel as the USAF again. Since then there have been some minor variations, mostly having to do with low-visibility versions of the star and bars roundel. Air superiority F-15s eliminated the blue outline in the 1970s, and later some aircraft replaced the blue and red with black or a countershaded color, or used a stencil to create an outlined "low-visibility" version. Almost all USAF aircraft now use low-visibility roundels in black or gray, with the full-color version limited to a small number of uncamouflaged aircraft such as the E-3 and E-8.

Partly due to the 1964 adoption, and early-April 1967 display initiation of the "racing stripe" insignia on its fixed-wing aircraft, the United States Coast Guard, unique among U.S. military organizations, uses the standard high-visibility roundel on the vertical fin of its fixed-wing aircraft as a fin flash.

Insignia
Official dates refers to when a new insignia was officially ordered but implementation was not always immediate.

Fin flashes and rudder stripes

See also
 Tail Code
 RCAF post-WW II roundels
 Royal Air Force roundels
 Military aircraft insignia

References

Bibliography

Section 40.1.1.2 Color of MIL-STD-2161A (AS), the colors of this insignia are established as FED-STD-595 red 11136 white 17925 blue 15044. Visualization of colors is from http://www.colorserver.net/showcolor.asp?fs=11136+17925+)

External links
 U.S. Naval Aircraft Marking page on USN Naval History and Heritage Command site

United States Air Force
United States Army Air Forces
Heraldry of the United States military
United States Navy
United States Marine Corps
Civil Air Patrol
Aircraft markings